Red Hills is a neighbourhood of Hyderabad in Telangana, India, which now serves as a residence for Mr. Mohd Mahboob Ali Khan and family.

Transport
Red Hills is well-connected by the buses, TSRTC, which play on two routes covering most of the area, and all the bus stops here. There local train station for MMTS trains are LAKDI-KA-POOL and NAMPALLY.

Major institutions
The area houses famous Niloufer Hospital - founded by the Ottoman princess Nilüfer Hanımsultan, the wife of one of the son of 7th Nizam Mir Osman Ali Khan and major cancer hospital MNJ Cancer Hospital. The Federation of Telangana and Andhra Pradesh Chambers of Commerce and Industry (FTAPCCI) is also located here.

References 

Neighbourhoods in Hyderabad, India